Anjana Productions is an Indian film production company established by Chiranjeevi and his brother Nagendra Babu in the year 1988. Named after their mother Anjana Devi. Anjana Productions is one of the noted Production companies in Telugu Cinema and is considered the home production company of Allu–Konidela family.

Film production

1988–1999
Anjana productions' first film was musical drama film Rudraveena (1988), directed by K. Balachander starring Chiranjeevi. The won the Nargis Dutt Award for Best Feature Film on National Integration. It later produced films such as Trinetrudu (1988), Mugguru Monagallu (1994) and Bavagaru Bagunnara? (1998).

2000–2009
In 2000, Nagendra Babu produced Kouravudu  himself playing the lead role. Later, he produced Gudumba Shankar (2004) with his younger brother Pawan Kalyan, and Stalin (2006) with Chiranjeevi in lead.

2010

After the failure of the 2010 romantic drama Orange, starring his nephew Ram Charan, Naga Babu is said to have incurred deep losses and announced that he will not be producing films anymore.

Filmography

References

Indian film studios
Film production companies based in Hyderabad, India
1988 establishments in Andhra Pradesh
Indian companies established in 1988